Mohamed Osman Ahmed (born 1974) is an Egyptian male weightlifter, competing in the 62 kg category and representing Egypt at international competitions. He competed at world championships, most recently at the 2003 World Weightlifting Championships.

Major results

References

1974 births
Living people
Egyptian male weightlifters
Place of birth missing (living people)
Date of birth missing (living people)
20th-century Egyptian people
21st-century Egyptian people